Akuka Albert Alalzuuga is a Ghanaian politician and member of the Seventh Parliament of the Fourth Republic of Ghana representing the Garu Constituency in the Upper East Region on the ticket of the National Democratic Congress (NDC).

Early life and education 
Akuka Albert Alalzuuga was born on 28 February 1968. He hold a BSC in Commerce from the University of Cape Coast and an HND in Accounting from the Tamale Polytechnic.

Religion 
Akuka is a Christian.

References

Ghanaian MPs 2017–2021
1968 births
Living people
National Democratic Congress (Ghana) politicians
Ghanaian MPs 2021–2025